In phonology, the ts–ch merger is the merger of the voiceless alveolar affricate  and the voiceless postalveolar affricate .

In Russian, it is the merger of the consonants rendered by letters Che and Tse. If the shift is towards Tse, it is called tsokanye; the shift towards Che is called chokanye.

It is a regular sound change of Lower Sorbian, but not Upper Sorbian, as seen in the difference between Lower Sorbian  and Upper Sorbian , both meaning "time".

In Polish the  merger is part of a more general dialectal feature called  (mazuration), present in many Polish dialects but named after the Masovian dialect.

It also occurs in a few areas of the Chakavian dialect of Serbo-Croatian, known as tsakavism.

The sabesdiker losn feature of Northeastern Yiddish includes the  merger.

Greek-speaking people may merge  (and ) into  (and ) when speaking foreign languages that contain those sounds.

References

Phonology
Russian language
Russian language varieties and styles